iManageProject is an online tool and application service provider for project management and team collaboration developed by Outside Software Inc. - a Romanian web development company based in Eastern Europe, founded in 2004. 
iManageProject's headquarters are located in Bucharest, Romania.

Features
 Better Communication
 Easy File Sharing
 Reusable Templates
 Time Tracking
 Milestones and ToDos
 Interactive WriteBoards

Product history
 iManageProject was launched in public beta in January 2011.

Reviews
The product has been reviewed by KillerStartups, TechSpotlight. SlapStart.

References

External links
 iManageProject Website

See also
 Project management software
 Comparison of project management software

Project management software
Collaborative software
Web applications
Groupware